Peter Hughes may refer to:
Peter Hughes (actor) (1922–2019), English actor
Peter Hughes (musician), member of the Mountain Goats (American folk rock band)
Peter Hughes (Irish politician) (died 1954)
Peter Hughes (diplomat) (born 1953), British former ambassador to North Korea
Peter Hughes (Australian politician) (born 1932), former Australian politician
Peter Hughes (footballer) (born 1934), Australian rules footballer
Pete Hughes (born 1968), American college baseball coach
Peter Tuesday Hughes, (1940–2005) American science fiction and mystery author
Peter Hughes (South African footballer), active in the 1950s

See also  
 Hughes (surname)